Cameron Stracher is a writer, law professor, and media lawyer. He is a graduate of Harvard Law School and teaches at New York Law School. After graduating from Harvard, he worked for one year at the law firm of Covington & Burling in Washington, D.C., and then moved to Iowa City, Iowa, where he received a Master of Fine Arts in creative writing and taught legal writing at the University of Iowa College of Law. Moving to New York City, he then spent five years at CBS, where he specialized in First Amendment litigation and other legal issues facing the media. Until August 2004, he was a partner at the law firm of Levine Sullivan Koch & Schulz in New York City. He later became general counsel of American Media, Inc. In 2011 he published a novel entitled The Water Wars.

References
 
  

Stracher, Cameron (2011) The Water Wars, William Morrow & Co., Illinois

Specific

External links
20th Darien Road Race

New York (state) lawyers
Harvard Law School alumni
University of Iowa alumni
Living people
University of Iowa College of Law faculty
People associated with Covington & Burling
Year of birth missing (living people)